To the North of Katmandu is a 1986 comedy film directed by Terence Ryan and starring Barbara Bach, Max Boyce, Billy Connolly and Ringo Starr. It was filmed in Kathmandu, Nepal.

The title references a line from the poem The Green Eye of the Yellow God.

Premise
Max Boyce takes part in the 1985 World Elephant Polo Championships in Katmandu.

Cast
 Max Boyce
 Barbara Bach
 Billy Connolly
 Ringo Starr

References

External links

1986 films
1986 comedy films
British comedy films
Films set in Nepal
Films shot in Nepal
Billy Connolly
Kathmandu
1980s English-language films
Films directed by Terence Ryan
1980s British films